Hamzabey is a  village in Lüleburgaz district of Kırklareli Province, Turkey,  It is situated in the eastern Trakya (Thrace) plains at . The population of the village is 339 as of 2011. The old name of this village is Koliba. It was a Bulgarian village during the Ottoman Empire era. But after the Second Balkan War the Bulgarian population was forced to leave the settlement.

References

Villages in Lüleburgaz District